Pyxis is a constellation in the Southern Hemisphere.

Pyxis may also refer to:
 Pyxis (vessel), a piece of ancient Greek pottery
 Pyxis (genus), a turtle genus
 Pyxis, a type of capsular fruit where the upper part falls off
 Pyxis, a Japanese idol duo consists of Miku Itō and Moe Toyota
 Pyxis Corporation, a manufacturer of medical technologies and automated dispensing cabinet (ADC) for medications
 Sony Pyxis, an early GPS navigation device launched in 1991

See also
 η Pyxidis, a star